Usta Muhammad (Balochi: استا محمد, Sindhi: اوستہ محمد)  district lies in the southeastern part of the Pakistani province of Balochistan. Usta Muhammad's headquarters are at Usta Mohammad tehsil.  Usta Muhammad District is sub-divided into two tehsils. It was created in September 2022 by dividing Jaffarabad District.

Usta Muhammad district lies in the eastern part of Balochistan, in the plains adjoining Sindh.

Demographics 

At the time of the 2017 census the district had a population of 260,865, of which 76,753 (29.42%) lived in urban areas. Usta Muhammad district had a sex ratio of 963 females per 1000 males and a literacy rate of 29.52% - 39.72% for males and 19.02% for females. 94,009 (36.03%) were under 10 years of age.

At the time of the 2017 census, 40.18% of the population spoke Balochi, 24.71% Sindhi, 19.05% Saraiki and 14.35% Brahui as their first language.

References

Districts of Balochistan, Pakistan